Y Friog is a small village in North Wales, near Fairbourne.

Its lake and beach are a tourist attraction to over 1,000 visitors a year.

Y Friog is notable for a rockfall-prone section of railway track, scene of two fatal accidents on the Aberystwith and Welsh Coast Railway line.

External links 

Photos of Friog and surrounding area

Villages in Gwynedd
Villages in Snowdonia
Arthog